The Democratic People's Party is a Ghanaian political party formed in 1992 after the ban on political party activity was lifted by the Provisional National Defence Council government of Ghana. The party claims to follow the Nkrumahist tradition along with the People's National Convention (PNC), Great Consolidated Popular Party (GCPP), National Reform Party (NRP) and the Convention People's Party (CPP).

Progressive Alliance
The party formed the "Progressive Alliance" with the National Democratic Congress (NDC) and the Every Ghanaian Living Everywhere (EGLE) for the presidential election in December 1992. Their common presidential candidate was Jerry Rawlings of the NDC. This alliance continued through the 1996 elections with the party not fielding its own candidates. The party however started fielding its own presidential and parliamentary candidates since the December 2000 elections but has won no seats in parliament.

2004 presidential election
The presidential nominee of the party,  Thomas N. Ward-Brew, a lawyer, was hours late submitting his nomination documents and was unable to contest the Ghanaian presidential election on 7 December 2004.

Election performance

Parliamentary elections

Presidential elections

Party symbols
The symbols of the party are as follow:
Motto: God is Great
Colours: The rainbow over a white background
Symbol: White dove with an olive branch and leaves in its mouth all over a rainbow.

See also
List of political parties in Ghana

References
Notes

External links
DPP information on Ghana Review International

1992 establishments in Ghana
Nkrumaist political parties
Pan-Africanism in Ghana
Pan-Africanist political parties in Africa
Political parties established in 1992
Political parties in Ghana
Socialist parties in Ghana